Bullington Warehouse is a historic tobacco storage warehouse located at Durham, Durham County, North Carolina, United States.  It was built in 1927, and is a three-story Romanesque style brick structure divided into four units by projecting corbeled firewalls.  Each unit has approximately 10,000 square feet per floor, giving a total of about 123,000 square feet. It is an example of "slow burn" masonry and wood factory construction. It was the last in a series of brick tobacco storage warehouses, unique in their architectural style, begun in 1897 and ending with this warehouse in 1927.  The building has been converted to residential use.

It was listed on the National Register of Historic Places in 1982.

References

Tobacco buildings in the United States
Industrial buildings and structures on the National Register of Historic Places in North Carolina
Romanesque Revival architecture in North Carolina
Industrial buildings completed in 1927
Buildings and structures in Durham, North Carolina
National Register of Historic Places in Durham County, North Carolina